James H. "Jack" Jones (January 16, 1927 – May 21, 2014) was an American politician.

Born in Geddes, South Dakota, Jones moved with his family to Miller, South Dakota, where he graduated from Miller High School. He served in the United States Army Air Forces. In 1950, Jones graduated from the South Dakota State University College of Pharmacy. He worked in his family's business Jones Drug in Miller, South Dakota. He served on the Miller City Council and as mayor. Jones also served in the South Dakota House of Representatives as a Republican in 1987. He died in Miller, South Dakota.

Notes

External links
Jack Jones-obituary

1927 births
2014 deaths
People from Charles Mix County, South Dakota
People from Miller, South Dakota
United States Army Air Forces soldiers
South Dakota State University alumni
Businesspeople from South Dakota
South Dakota city council members
Mayors of places in South Dakota
Republican Party members of the South Dakota House of Representatives
20th-century American businesspeople